Marsh Marshall is an American economist, venture capital and hedge fund manager, and television producer. He is the author of "Organizations and Growth in Rural China", academic and newspaper articles on China's economy and on venture capital investing.  He is currently Chief Operating Officer at the quantitative hedge fund, Periwinkle Trading LLC, and is writing a book on investment, economic growth and corporate governance.

Early life
Marshall was born in 1953 and raised in Washington DC, where he graduated from Georgetown Preparatory School in 1971. In 1975, he earned a bachelor's degree in history from Tufts University (magna cum laude); a 1977 master's degree in development economics from Stanford University, and a 1983 doctorate degree in economics from Oxford University, where he was a Tutor in Economics at Magdalen College.  His doctoral thesis focused on the relationship between institutions and economic growth. In July 1979, Marshall was a member of a small delegation of Oxford and Cambridge economists invited by the Chinese Academy of Social Science to discuss economic reforms with China's leader, Deng Xiaoping.  In a 1979 article, Marshall presented evidence that the apparent success of Mao Zedong's agricultural model, Dazhai, was a fraud. In 1981, China's post-Mao leadership acknowledged the fraud in Beijing Review.

Business career
In 1993-1995 Marshall led a Silicon Valley-based team of designers and engineers for Bell Atlantic in the development of user interfaces and electronic program guides for video-on-demand service, for which Marshall was issued a US patent.   In 1996, Marshall was subsequently appointed Vice President at Tele-TV, a partnership of Bell Atlantic, NYNEX and Pacific Bell. In 1998, Marshall was IXI Corporation's Chief Operating Officer, and helped establish a data network of $10 trillion in directly measured financial assets from large mutual funds, banks, and insurance companies; after the 2009 sale of the company to Equifax (NYSE: EFX), Marshall became President of the IXI Digital division of Equifax. In 2000, Marshall became a General Partner at a $90 million, Rothschild-sponsored venture capital firm, ECentury Capital, where he made equity and debt investments in software, semiconductor, and digital media companies and served on eight boards. Marshall is currently Chief Operating Officer at the statistical arbitrage, systematic hedge fund Periwinkle Trading LLC, founded by Scott Smallwood, former Managing Director at Morgan Stanley's quantitative hedge fund, Process Driven Trading.  In 2011, Marshall was appointed Chairman of the Board of Bluecava, a California software and digital device data company. He was a board director of Linkable Networks and a senior adviser at I2 Capital

Film and television career
Marshall's television career was centered at the British Broadcasting Corporation in London, where he was trained in news and current affairs production. Marshall was with the British Broadcasting Corporation for five years and produced and directed more than a dozen major programs and films. His filmography includes Life After Debt for BBC Panorama; Moneylenders for PBS Frontline; On Course for War (for Panorama); Czech Mate (with BBC Foreign Affairs Editor John Simpson); Review of the Year 1989 with Jonathan Dimbleby, a 90-minute Christmas season film for BBC1,  In 1993, he directed a BBC drama, War with America, a special effects film set in the future, with a cast of British actors,.

Filmography
"War with America" 1993 (Director)
"Sleepwalking to War?" 1990 (Producer)
"Czech-mate: Inside the Revolution" 1990, (Producer)
"Conference Day Labor 89" 1989 (Producer)
"Conference Day Sdp" 89" 1989 (Producer)
"Conference Day Conservatives 89" 1989 (Producer)
"Walking Tall" 1988 (Associate Producer)
"Kilroy" 1988 (Producer)
"On Course for War" 1984 (Associate Producer)
"Life after Debt" 1983 (Producer)

References

21st-century American economists
American television producers
1953 births
Living people